Brother Egbert Xavier Kelly, F.S.C., was an Irish De La Salle Brother who was last assigned to the De La Salle Brothers in the Philippines and was kidnapped and then murdered by the retreating Japanese Imperial Forces at the De La Salle College, of which he was President, during the Allied Liberation of Manila during World War II.

Early life 

He was born William Kelly on 4 March 1894 in County Wicklow, Ireland. During his youth decided to become a De La Salle brother and went to the Christian Brothers Retreat in Castletown to test his vocation. He was then admitted to the novitiate and became a member of the Institute.

Assignment to the Philippines 

In 1911 Kelly  was assigned to the Christian Brothers District of Penang. During his trip, he went for a brief stay in Colombo, Ceylon after which he proceeded to De La Salle College in Manila. He began teaching in the grade school department until he was tasked to teach in the high school department.

Assignment to Belgium 

Kelly was selected by the Christian Brothers Superiors to help in the establishment of a Second Novitiate at the General Motherhouse in Lebecq-les-Hal, Belgium. This assignment was completed in 1930.

Return to the Philippines 

Upon the completion of his assignment to the Motherhouse, Brother Xavier returned to Asia to teach for three years in Rangoon, Burma, and another three years in Hong Kong. In 1935, he was reassigned to Manila and was appointed President of De La Salle College in 1937.

Kelly's first six years as President was spent in expanding the facilities of the College. A large classroom wing was constructed at the north end of St. La Salle Hall and a new chapel was constructed at its south end. This chapel was considered the most beautiful in the Philippines and had few rivals in the District, although the Brothers would regret about the chapel's limited size. The chapel was dedicated in 1940 and was large enough to accommodate the school's entire student body, which was then 1,200.

World War II 
Kelly was the President of De La Salle College in Manila when the Japanese army invaded the Philippines on 8 December 1941.

In January 1942, Japanese troops forcibly entered De La Salle College and began to occupy all but a small portion of the building. The Irish Brothers were left to the chapel and a few small rooms while the American De La Salle Christian Brothers were interned, first in a retreat house of the Society of Jesus at Santa Ana, Manila, and then in a Spanish hospital in San Pedro, Makati. They were later put in a Japanese concentration camp in Los Baños, Laguna, until they were rescued and freed together with their other fellow clergy-prisoners by the American Forces under General Douglas MacArthur in February 1945.

The other De La Salle Christian Brothers on the De La Salle Taft Campus, including Kelly, were not imprisoned by the Japanese at the start of the Japanese Occupation and permitted to stay on the De La Salle campus on Taft Avenue.

On 10 February 1945, a Japanese detail forcibly took Kelly and separated him from the others in the building. He was never seen again and his body was never recovered.

Kelly, plus the other 16 De La Salle Christian Brothers soon murdered by the Japanese inside De La Salle College during February 1945, are now honored with an elegant marble plaque at the entrance of the De La Salle Main Chapel.

Sainthood
The Congregation for the Causes of Saints already preserved the cause of Bro. Kelly, but hasn't yet given the decree of nihil obstat and the title as "Servant of God" by the Holy See.

References

External links
 

1894 births
1945 deaths
People from County Wicklow
Roman Catholic religious brothers
Irish Roman Catholic missionaries
Presidents of De La Salle University
De La Salle Brothers in the Philippines
Irish expatriates in the Philippines
People executed by Japanese occupation forces
Irish people executed abroad
Extrajudicial killings in World War II
20th-century Roman Catholic martyrs
Presidents of universities and colleges in the Philippines
Roman Catholic missionaries in the Philippines